Ruhul Amin (14 March 1940 – 7 January 2013) was a Bangladeshi film director.

Biography
Amin was born on 14 March 1940 in Dhaka. His ancestors' home is situated at Pubail in Gazipur.

Amin's first direction, Nijere Haraye Khuji was released in 1972. He also directed films like Gangchil and Beiman which were selected for preservation in Bangladesh Film Archive.

Amin died in his own house in Moinartek, Dhaka on 7 January 2013 at the age of 72.

Selected filmography
 Nijere Haraye Khuji
 Gangchil
 Beiman
 Rong Berong
 Target

References

1940 births
2013 deaths
Bangladeshi film directors
People from Dhaka District